The 1981 British Grand Prix was a Formula One motor race held at Silverstone on 18 July 1981. It was the ninth race of the 1981 Formula One World Championship. John Watson won his first race for five years, and McLaren's first since James Hunt's victory at the 1977 Japanese Grand Prix. The race also marked the first victory for a carbon fibre composite monocoque F1 car, the McLaren MP4/1.

Classification

Qualifying

†-time disallowed.

Race

Championship standings after the race

Drivers' Championship standings

Constructors' Championship standings

Note: Only the top five positions are included for both sets of standings.

References

British Grand Prix
British Grand Prix
1981 in British motorsport
British Grand Prix